Chris Malone (born June 10, 1957) a former North Carolina State Representative, was the Deputy Majority Whip for the 2017-2018 Session. He is a Republican, once representing  District 35. He was defeated in his bid for a 4th term on November 6, 2018, by Democrat Terence Everitt.

Wake County School Board
Malone was elected to the Wake County School Board from 2009 to his election to the North Carolina House of Representatives in 2012.

During his tenure on the school board, Malone voted to raise the salaries of school board members, including himself.

NC House of Representatives
Committee Assignments, 2017-2018 Session

Standing or Select Committee	Status
Alcoholic Beverage Control	Member
Appropriations	Vice-Chairman
Appropriations, Health and Human Services	Chairman
Energy and Public Utilities	Member
Health	Member
House Select Committee on Redistricting	Member
House Select Committee on School Safety	Member
Insurance	Member
Wildlife Resources	Chairman

Non-Standing Committee	Status
Joint Legislative Education Oversight Committee	Advisory Member
Joint Legislative Oversight Committee on Health and Human Services	Member
Committee on Intellectual and Developmental Disabilities (LRC)(2017)	Member
Joint Legislative Oversight Committee on Medicaid and NC Health Choice	Advisory Member

References

External links

1957 births
Living people
Republican Party members of the North Carolina House of Representatives